Richard Clough Anderson Jr. (August 4, 1788 – July 24, 1826) was an American lawyer, politician, and diplomat from Jefferson County, Kentucky. He served as a member of the United States House of Representatives from Kentucky. He is the son of Richard Clough Anderson Sr. and the grandfather of Larz Anderson.

Early life
Anderson was born at Soldier's Retreat near Louisville, Kentucky. His father, Richard Clough Anderson Sr., was a Revolutionary War Lt. Colonel in the 5th Virginia continentals, who led the advance of the Americans at the battle of Trenton (24 December 1776), crossing the Delaware River in the first boat.

Anderson attended private schools, later graduating from The College of William & Mary in Williamsburg, Virginia in 1804. He later studied law under Judge St. George Tucker and was admitted to the bar, practicing law in Louisville. His mother was Elizabeth Clark Anderson, of the Rogers Clark family. All of his uncles from his mother's side were military officers—five of them during the Revolutionary War. Two of his uncles had become quite famous: General George Rogers Clark, hero of the taking of Fort Sackville at Vincennes, IN, and considered to be the founder of Louisville, and Captain William Clark, of the Lewis and Clark Expedition. His younger brothers included civil war general Robert Anderson and Ohio Governor Charles Anderson.

Career
Anderson was elected to the Kentucky House of Representatives in 1815 and then was elected as a Democratic-Republican to the United States House of Representatives in 1816 and 1818, serving in the Fifteenth and Sixteenth Congresses from March 4, 1817 through March 3, 1821. While in Congress, Anderson served as the chairman of the House Committee on Public Lands in the Sixteenth Congress. Anderson did not seek reelection to the House in 1820. He later served again as a member of the Kentucky House of Representatives in 1821 and 1822 and served as Speaker of the Kentucky House of Representatives in 1822.

Anderson was appointed as the first United States Minister Plenipotentiary to the Gran Colombia on January 27, 1823. Prior to his departure, he sold several of his slaves to improve his finances. In 1824 he negotiated with Pedro Gual and concluded the Anderson–Gual Treaty, the first bilateral treaty that the U.S. signed with another American state. Anderson took his leave from his post on June 7, 1825, after being commissioned as Envoy Extraordinary and Minister Plenipotentiary to the Panama Congress of Nations.

Anderson died en route to his post in Turbaco, near Cartagena, Colombia on July 24, 1826. He is buried at Soldier's Retreat.

Legacy
Anderson County, Kentucky is named in his honor.

References

External links
biographic sketch at U.S. Congress website

1788 births
1826 deaths
College of William & Mary alumni
Politicians from Louisville, Kentucky
Members of the Kentucky House of Representatives
Speakers of the Kentucky House of Representatives
Burials at Cave Hill Cemetery
Ambassadors of the United States to Colombia
19th-century American diplomats
Democratic-Republican Party members of the United States House of Representatives from Kentucky
19th-century American politicians